KGDC (1320 AM) is a radio station based in Walla Walla, Washington, broadcasting on 1320 kHz in the AM radio spectrum.  Two Hearts Communications, LLC, has been the licensee of KGDC since 2001.

KGDC broadcasts a news/talk format and is the sole source of Fox News for the Walla Walla, WA, and Milton-Freewater, OR, areas.  Talk hosts include Bill Bennett, Laura Ingraham, Dennis Prager, Michael Medved and Hugh Hewitt.

References

External links
Official website

News and talk radio stations in the United States
Walla Walla, Washington
GDC